Furqan and Imran,  commonly known as F&I) is the Pakistani musical band from Karachi which originated in 2013. The band mainly covers genres like Rock, Pop and Classical. The founding members of the band are Imran Butt as vocalist and Furqan Tunio as guitarist/lyricist/composer

History
The band released its first song "Main Jeeliya" on SoundCloud in 2013, after some time it was selected for the soundtrack of the drama serial Ru Baru produced under the banner of Moomal Productions on Hum TV.

The band released their second track "Piya Re" in 2014 by featuring Pakistani actress Mathira on it, by paying the tribute to Adnan Sami Khan's song "Bheegi Bheegi Raaton Mein". The band also produced a mashup cover track by combining two famous songs from India and Pakistan, "Teri Deewani" by Kailash Kher and "Awari" by the band Soch.

Band members
 Imran Imtiaz Butt - vocals (2013–present)
 Furqan Hussain Tunio - Lead guitar, lyrics / composition (2013–present)

Discography

Singles
 Main Jeeliya
 Main Jeeliya OST Ru Baru
 Piya re feat. Mathira
 Teri Deewani/Awari cover

See also 
 List of Pakistani music bands

References

External links
 SoundCloud

Pakistani musical trios
Musical groups established in 2012
Pakistani musical groups
Pakistani rock music groups
Musical groups from Karachi
2012 establishments in Pakistan
Year of birth missing (living people)